The Centre hospitalier universitaire de Sherbrooke (CHUS) is the public healthcare network in Sherbrooke, Quebec, Canada, affiliated with the Université de Sherbrooke Faculty of Medecine.

The CHUS offers general, specialized and sub-specialized medicine and is the teaching hospital in the administrative regions of Estrie, Centre-du-Québec, and the eastern portion of the Montérégie. It is also the center of reference in quaternary gamma knife radiosurgery for Quebec and Eastern Canada. With 6,244 employees, 649 doctors and pharmacists, and more than 3,700 students, the CHUS is an academic and economic hub in southeastern Quebec and is the second largest employer in the Estrie region.

CHUS affiliated hospitals
CHUS – Hôtel-Dieu
CHUS – Hôpital Fleurimont

References

External links

Hospitals established in 1995
Buildings and structures in Sherbrooke
Université de Sherbrooke
Hospitals in Quebec
Teaching hospitals in Canada